Whelihan is an Anglicized Irish surname. Notable people with the surname include:

Craig Whelihan (born 1971), American football player
James Austin Whelihan (1902–1986), Canadian priest

Anglicised Irish-language surnames